WRT, or wrt, may refer to:

Organisations
 Wallace Roberts & Todd, an architecture firm in Philadelphia, Pennsylvania, US
 W Racing Team, a Belgian auto racing team

Science and technology
 Linksys WRT54G series, wireless routers
 Web Runtime (WRT) for the Symbian/S60 platform

Transport
 WRT, the IATA code for Warton Aerodrome in Lancashire, UK
 WRT, the National Rail code for Worstead railway station in Norfolk, UK

See also